This is a list of Queen's Park Football Club seasons up to the present day. The list details Queen's Park's record in major league and cup competitions, and the club's top league goal scorer of each season. Top scorers in bold were also the top scorers in Queen's Park's division that season. Records of regular minor competitions such as the Glasgow Cup are only included for seasons where the club reached a final.

Summary

Queen's Park is the oldest football club in Scotland, founded in 1867. They were the nation's earliest dominant force, winning 10 Scottish Cups over the competition's first two decades, providing many players to the Scotland national football team (including all 11 players for the first official international match in 1872) and also playing in the English FA Cup final on two occasions in the 1880s when Scottish teams were permitted to enter. Determined to maintain an amateur ethos at the club, they declined to participate in the Scottish Football League when it launched in 1890, eventually joining ten years later – by which time professionalism had been adopted and standards raised among their competitors, most prominently Glasgow rivals Celtic and Rangers who soon began to eclipse the Spiders success and popularity. Despite their diminishing status, in an ambitious 1903 project the club constructed the world's largest stadium, Hampden Park (their third home ground bearing that name) which became the national stadium for cup finals and Scotland fixtures, though still proudly owned by the amateurs.'Lundere causa ludendi', Ignasi Torne, Panenka magazine, 29 January 2017, via Stuart Spencer / Scottish Football Museum

Although no longer making an impact on the Scottish Cup and consistently among the lower-ranked sides in Division One (any successful period would usually result in all the best players quickly being signed by professional clubs, with no financial incentive to entice them to stay meaning there was never much chance to build and maintain a strong squad), with the exception of one year Queen's Park still maintained their top level status until after World War II, but after a relegation in 1948 they only returned to the elite group for two more seasons in the 1950s, and then fell towards the bottom of the lower tier, dropping into a third division when it was introduced in the 1970s and a fourth division in the 1990s, remaining there since and playing home matches at a modernised, near-empty Hampden Park.

With relegation out of the Scottish Professional Football League system having been introduced, in 2019 the club's members voted to turn professional in an effort to pull away from the lowest reaches of the setup and maintain greater control over the young players they trained, who had previously been allowed to move on for nothing. They also sold Hampden to the Scottish Football Association, using the funds to upgrade the adjacent training ground Lesser Hampden to become their regular match from 2021, having already built a new club pavilion there seven years earlier.

SeasonsKeyNotes

 League performance summary 
The Scottish Football League was founded in 1890 and, other than during seven years of hiatus during World War II, the national top division has been played every season since. The following is a summary of Queen's Park's divisional status:125 total eligible seasons (including 2021–22)42 seasons in top level28 seasons in second level23 seasons in third level22 seasons in fourth level10' seasons not involved – before club was league member

References

External links
History at Queen's Park FC official website 
Soccerbase
FitbaStats
Football Club History Database
Playing Records at QPFC.com

Seasons
 
Queen's Park
Queen's Park F.C.-related lists